Rolls-Royce Park Ward may refer to one of several vehicles manufactured by Rolls-Royce Motors between 1995 and 2002:

The limousine version of the Rolls-Royce Silver Spirit Mark IV
The extended wheelbase version of the Rolls-Royce Silver Seraph

Park Ward